The 1984 Asia Golf Circuit was the 23rd season of golf tournaments that comprised the Asia Golf Circuit.

John Jacobs claimed the overall circuit title.

Tournament schedule
The table below shows the 1984 Asian Golf Circuit schedule. Due to economic turmoil in the Philippines, the Philippine Open was dropped from the circuit.

Final standings
The Asia Golf Circuit operated a points based system to determine the overall circuit champion, with points being awarded in each tournament to the leading players. At the end of the season, the player with the most points was declared the circuit champion, and there was a prize pool to be shared between the top players in the points table.

References

Asia Golf Circuit
Asia Golf Circuit